El Fenix can refer to:

El Fénix (automobile), a Spanish automobile
El Fenix (restaurant), a chain of restaurants in Texas